The 2015 Major League Baseball (MLB) First-Year Player Draft was held from June 8 through June 10, 2015, to assign amateur baseball players to MLB teams. The draft order is the reverse order of the 2014 MLB season standings. As the Diamondbacks finished the 2014 season with the worst record, they had the first overall selection. In addition, the Houston Astros had the 2nd pick of the 2015 draft, as compensation for failing to sign Brady Aiken, the first overall selection of the 2014 MLB Draft.

Twelve free agents received and rejected qualifying offers of $15.3 million for the 2015 season, entitling their teams to compensatory draft choices if they are signed by another team. The team signing the player will lose their first round choice, though the first ten picks are protected. The New York Mets surrendered their first round pick (15th overall) to sign Michael Cuddyer, while the Colorado Rockies gained a supplementary pick.  The Toronto Blue Jays lost their pick for signing Russell Martin, giving a compensatory pick to the Pittsburgh Pirates. The Boston Red Sox surrendered their second- and third-round picks (Boston's first pick is protected) to sign Pablo Sandoval and Hanley Ramírez. The San Francisco Giants and Los Angeles Dodgers received supplementary picks.

Dean Kremer became the first ever Israeli drafted in an MLB draft, when selected in the 38th round, by the Padres.

First round selections

Compensatory round

Competitive Balance Round A

Other notable selections

See also

List of first overall Major League Baseball draft picks

Notes
Compensation picks

Trades

References

Major League Baseball draft
Draft
Major League Baseball draft
Major League Baseball draft
Baseball in New Jersey
Events in New Jersey
Sports in Hudson County, New Jersey
Secaucus, New Jersey